The 42nd Canadian Parliament was in session from December 3, 2015, to September 11, 2019, with the membership of its lower chamber, the House of Commons of Canada, having been determined by the results of the 2015 federal election held on October 19, 2015, and thirty new appointees to its Upper House, the Senate of Canada. Parliament officially resumed on December 3, 2015, with the election of a new Speaker, Geoff Regan, followed by a Speech from the Throne the following day. The Speaker of the Senate of Canada was George Furey, who was appointed Speaker of the Canadian Senate on the advice of Prime Minister Justin Trudeau, to replace Leo Housakos, on December 3, 2015. On September 11, 2019, Prime Minister Justin Trudeau advised Governor General Julie Payette to dissolve Parliament and issue the writ of election, leading to a 5-week election campaign period for the 2019 federal election. Significant legislation adopted during the 42nd Parliament included the Cannabis Act, the Greenhouse Gas Pollution Pricing Act, the Comprehensive Economic and Trade Agreement Implementation Act, the Trans-Pacific Partnership Implementation Act, the Canada Infrastructure Bank Act, the Impact Assessment Act and Canadian Energy Regulator Act, as well as the legalizing of medical assistance in dying and adding gender identity and expression to the list of prohibited grounds of discrimination in the Canadian Human Rights Act.

Party standings

Legislation
Among the more significant pieces of legislation adopted in the 42nd Parliament was Bill C-14, passed with a free vote, as the government's response to Carter v Canada; it inserted the term "medical assistance in dying" into the Criminal Code and made provisions for adult Canadians to engage in the practice. Bill C-16 added "gender identity or expression" to the list of prohibited grounds of discrimination in the Canadian Human Rights Act and the list of characteristics of identifiable groups protected from hate propaganda in the Criminal Code – with only 40 Conservative Party members, who were all granted a free vote, opposed the bill. With all party support, the Accessible Canada Act (Bill C-81) created the Canadian Accessibility Standards Development Organization and the positions of Accessibility Commissioner as a member of the Human Rights Commission and Chief Accessibility Officer as an adviser to the minister responsible for accessibility. The Cannabis Act (Bill C-45) created a legal framework that allows for recreational use of cannabis by adults. Bill C-69 repealed and replaced the Canadian Environmental Assessment Act and the National Energy Board Act with the Impact Assessment Act and the Canadian Energy Regulator Act, respectively, and renamed the Navigation Protection Act to the Canadian Navigable Waters Act with new considerations for what constitutes 'navigable water'. With only the Conservative Party opposed, Bill C-55 amended the Oceans Act to require the use of the precautionary principle in establishing a marine protected areas and added the maintenance of ecological integrity as a reason for their establishment. In November 2018 Bill C-89 ended a strike action by employees of Canada Post.

In modernizing existing legislation, the Transportation Modernization Act (Bill C-49) amended the Canada Transportation Act to, among other things, implement long-haul interswitching as a permanent mechanism in the rail industry, exclude revenue from interswitching and from the movement of grain in containers on flatcars from Canadian National Railway and Canadian Pacific Railway's maximum revenue entitlement,; require railway companies to keep up-to-date plans for each of their railway lines and to publicly report on their abilities to move a given summer's grain crop along with a winter contingency plans, raise the foreign ownership limits for Canadian airlines from 25% to 49% of an airline's voting interest with the new rule that no single foreign investor may own more than 25%, expand the review of joint ventures in the airline industry to also include the public interest and fair competition practices; the bill also amended several other transportation-related acts including the CN Commercialization Act to increase the individual ownership limit in Canadian National Railway from 15% to 25%, and the Railway Safety Act to require the installation of locomotive voice and video recorders onto trains. Bill C-23 repealed the Preclearance Act, 1999 and replaced it with the Preclearance Act, 2016 Bill C-59 modernized national security matters by adopting four new acts titled the National Security and Intelligence Review Agency Act, the Avoiding Complicity in Mistreatment by Foreign Entities Act and the  Intelligence Commissioner Act and Communications Security Establishment Act, in addition to making amendments to the Canadian Security Intelligence Service Act, Security of Canada Information Sharing Act and Secure Air Travel Act. Bill C-25 variously amended the Canada Business Corporations Act, Canada Cooperatives Act, and Canada Not‑for‑profit Corporations Act to, among other things, allow more online tools to be used to disseminate required information to shareholders in notice and access systems, to require certain types of corporations to disclose to shareholders the composition of their boards and senior management, as well as their diversity policies or the statement that they do not have a diversity policy. The bill also prohibited businesses from issuing bearer forms of share certificates and share warrants and modified how directors of certain corporations and cooperatives are elected: that they must be elected individually, not as a slate or a group of candidates, and reduce maximum term lengths from 3 to 1 years. Bill C-57 updated how Canada's Sustainable Development Strategy is implemented. Bill C-78 updated the Divorce Act and two other related acts, as well as brought them in line with international standards of the Child Protection Convention and Child Support Convention.

On public safety and crime, Bill C-46 inserted new provisions into the Criminal Code regarding drug–impaired driving and the ability of peace officers to use drug screening equipment and random breath testing. On animal cruelty, Bill C-84 expanded the Criminal Code's provisions against cockpits to include any "arena for animal fighting" and in response to the Supreme Court of Canada findings in R. v. D.L.W., added a definition for bestiality. Bill C-75, generally seeking to address court delays and promote fair and efficient trails but also included multiple other amendments, removed the allowance of peremptory challenge, allowed warrants to be acted upon anywhere in Canada rather than only in its originating province, added new provisions for videoconference by judges and court participants, restricted the use of preliminary inquiries to only cases involving offences punishable by life imprisonment, reclassified an additional 115 offenses as hybrid offenses so that they may be prosecuted either as summary convictions or as indictable offences, increased the maximum penalty for summary convictions to two years imprisonment, and deleted or amended offenses from the Criminal Code that the Supreme Court found to be unconstitutional (abortion in R v Morgentaler, vagrancy in R v Heywood, spreading false news in R v Zundel, anal intercourse in R v CM, and those offenses in R v Martineau). Bill C-51 repealed or modified provisions within the Criminal Code found to be unconstitutional or obsolete, including those against dueling, blasphemous libel, witchcraft, crime comics and trading stamps and, in response to R v JA, clarified that an unconscious person is unable to grant consent to sexual activity. The Expungement of Historically Unjust Convictions Act (Bill C-66) allows the Parole Board of Canada to expunge historical convictions related to gross indecency, buggery or anal intercourse. Bill C-93 created a process in the Criminal Records Act to allow individuals convicted of possession of cannabis before its legalization to request a record suspension. Partially in response to recent court decisions on solitary confinement and the recommendations of the Ashley Smith inquest, Bill C-83 replaced the system of administrative and disciplinary segregation in federal prisons with "structured intervention units". Bill C-71 amended the Firearms Act to delete the 5-year limitation on background checks, mandate that sellers verify a licence before selling a non‑restricted firearm, require sellers to maintain records of sales, require that automatic authorization to transport documents specify destinations and repeals the Governor in Council's ability to reclassify specific firearms between restricted and non-restricted. Bill C-71 also undid the provisions in the Economic Action Plan 2015 Act, No. 1 exempting the Ending the Long‑gun Registry Act from the Privacy Act, Access to Information Act and the Library and Archives of Canada Act; and allows Quebec access to the Canadian Firearms Registry Data as requested in Quebec (AG) v Canada (AG).

Responding to other legislation adopted during the previous parliament, Bill C-37, removed some of the obstacles to supervised injection sites that the previous parliament's Respect for Communities Act had put in place and replaced the previous government's National Anti-Drug Strategy with the new Canadian Drugs and Substances Strategy, mostly centered on the opioid epidemic. Bill C-6 amended or repealed parts of the previous parliament's Strengthening Canadian Citizenship Act including the ability to revoke citizenship based on national security, the requirement that applicants for citizenship aged 14 to 18 and 55 to 64 to prove adequate knowledge Canada and of an official language, the residency requirement increase from three years to four years, the disallowance of time spent as temporary resident as contributing to the residency requirement, and the condition of citizenship that the applicant must intend to reside in Canada. Bill C-6 kept, but modified or expanded, Strengthening Canadian Citizenship Acts prohibition that time spent imprisoned does not contribute to the residency requirement, that an imprisoned applicant may not be granted citizenship, and that citizenship applicants must file tax returns during their residency requirement. In addition to adding a purpose statement to the Fisheries Act, Bill C-68 restored the provision against the harmful alteration, disruption or destruction of fish habitat that the Jobs, Growth and Long-term Prosperity Act had deleted. Bill C-4 repealed two private member bills adopted in the last parliament concerning union voting and financial reporting. Preparing for the 2016 Census, and in response to the previous government's involvement in the 2011 Census, Bill C-36 amended the Statistics Act to provide more independence to the Chief Statistician, remove imprisonment as a penalty for not responding to a census, and replacing the National Statistics Council with the Canadian Statistics Advisory Council. Bills C-17 and C-88 amended the previous parliament's Yukon and Nunavut Regulatory Improvement Act and the Northwest Territories Oil and Gas Operations Act, respectively, to address certain objections to the previous legislation. Bill C-62 restored or addressed changes made by the previous parliament to the Federal Public Sector Labour Relations Act regarding the determination of essential services, the ability to select between arbitration and conciliation to resolve collective bargaining disputes, and matters related to sick and disability leave.

Following through with international agreements, Bill C-11 implemented the Marrakesh VIP Treaty, Bill C-13 implemented the Bali Package, Bill C-64 implemented the Wreck Removal Convention, Bill C-82 implemented the BEPS multilateral instrument, and Bill C-31 implemented the Canada–Ukraine Free Trade Agreement, all with unanimous consent, while the Comprehensive Economic and Trade Agreement (Bill C-30) and the Trans-Pacific Partnership (Bill C-79) were implemented with only Liberals and Conservatives in support. Fulfilling a condition to ending Trump tariffs on steel and aluminum, Bill C-101 suspended, until 2021, the moratorium on trade safeguards. Further integrating the principles of the Declaration on the Rights of Indigenous Peoples, the Indigenous Languages Act (Bill C-91) created the Office of the Commissioner of Indigenous Languages to support the efforts of Indigenous peoples in maintaining Indigenous languages and Bill C-92 expanded the what is considered the best interests of an Indigenous child in the provision of child and family services to include the child's traditions, customs and language. With only Liberal Party support, Bill C-7 was adopted as the government's response to the Supreme Court's ruling in Mounted Police Association of Ontario v. Canada (Attorney General), allowing RCMP members to have certain collective bargaining rights. Bill C-22 created the National Security and Intelligence Committee of Parliamentarians. Bill C-58 amended the Access to Information Act to insert a new purpose statement, insert in requirements to make requests, allow bad faith or vexatious requests to be refused, and require proactive publication of certain information (e.g. travel expenses, hospitality expenses, etc.) Bill C-10 amended the Air Canada Public Participation Act to expand where Air Canada's maintenance centres may be located to the general provinces of Manitoba, Ontario and Quebec, rather than the specific cities of Winnipeg, Mississauga and Montreal. With only the Conservative Party and Bloc Québécois opposed, Bill C-50 created new reporting requirements for political fundraising events attended by a party leader or a minister and expanded the reporting of leadership campaign expenses.

Financial measures
Regarding financial measures, Bill C-2 amended the Income Tax Act to lower federal tax paid on income between $45,283 and $90,563 from 22% to 20.5% and introduce a new top tax bracket that applies a rate of 33% to a person's income in excess of $200,000. The bill also re-instated the $5,500 annual limit to Tax-Free Savings Account contributions which the previous parliament had raised to $10,000. Bill C-26 amended the Canada Pension Plan to create the Additional Canada Pension Plan Account and to increase the maximum level of pensionable earnings.

The legislative changes resulting from the 2016 budget were implemented in Bill C-15 and Bill C-29 and included replacing the Canada Child Tax Benefit and Universal Child Care Benefit with the Canada Child Benefit, repealing the Family Tax Cut (income splitting) Credit, Education Tax Credit, Textbook Tax Credit, Children's Arts Tax Credit, Child Fitness Tax Credit, creating the School Supplies Tax Credit, exempting insulin pens, intermittent urinary catheters and feminine hygiene products from GST/HST, allowing a charity or athletic association to hold up to 20% interest in a limited partnership business, and expanding the definition of "Canadian exploration expense" to include environmental studies and community consultations conducted as a condition of obtaining a licence or permit. The Canadian Forces disability award and death benefit were raised to $360,000; the rates for Northern Residents Deduction were increased by 33%; and employment insurance benefits were temporarily extended for high unemployment areas (e.g. the northern areas of the provinces of Ontario, Manitoba, Saskatchewan and BC, the cities of Sudbury and Whitehorse, and most of the provinces of Alberta and Newfoundland and Labrador). Bill C-15 also repealed the previous parliament's Federal Balanced Budget Act and rolled back its age eligibility for the Old Age Security pension and Guaranteed Income Supplement from 67 to 65 years old.

The legislative changes resulting from the 2017 budget were implemented in Bill C-44 and Bill C-63 Among the changes was the phasing out of the Canada Savings Bond program, making vehicle for hire companies subject to GST/HST, exempting naloxone from GST/HST, eliminating of the Public Transit Tax Credit and Investment Tax Credit for Child Care Spaces, eliminating the GST/HST rebate for non-residents using Canadian accommodations as part of a tour package, increasing the excise tax on tobacco products and tying increases of the excise tax on alcoholic products to the consumer price index, and allowing mark-to-market accounting to be used for income tax calculations in forward rate and swap agreements. Bill C-44 included, within it, the Canada Infrastructure Bank Act to invest directly or attract private investment in infrastructure projects that are anticipated to generate revenue and be in the public interest, and the Invest in Canada Act which created the new crown corporation called Invest in Canada Hub to promote foreign direct investment and created the Service Fees Act to replace the User Fees Act. Bill C-63 included, within it, the Asian Infrastructure Investment Bank Agreement Act so Canada could join the Asian Infrastructure Investment Bank, repealed the Timber Marking Act, and created the Canadian Free Trade Agreement Implementation Act to replace the Agreement on Internal Trade Implementation Act.

The legislative changes resulting from the 2018 budget were implemented in Bill C-74 and Bill C-86. Among the changes was making cannabis subject to an excise duty, requiring the excise duty on tobacco products be adjusted for inflation every year instead of every five years, reducing the small business tax rate from 10.5% to and to 9%, removing the requirement for a risk score to Canadian Armed Forces personnel and police officers serving on international missions to qualify for tax relief on income earned while deployed, amending the Veterans Well-being Act to merge four benefit programs to create the new Income Replacement Benefit and replacing the Disability Award with a new 'pain and suffering compensation', renaming the 'Working Income Tax Benefit' to the 'Canada Workers Benefit' while increasing its rate from 25% to 26%, expanding the Medical Expense Tax Credit to cover the costs of caring for a service animal benefiting those living with a severe mental impairment, extending the Mineral Exploration Tax Credit by one year, extending the accelerated capital cost allowance program for clean energy generation and energy conservation equipment to 2025, expanding who is subject to Tax-on-Split-Income rules, creates the office of the Chief Information Officer of Canada, extends the provincial equalization payments program to 2024, and inserted provisions for deferred prosecution agreements into the Criminal Code. Bill C-74 included, within it, the Greenhouse Gas Pollution Pricing Act which created national standards for carbon pricing in Canada (i.e. a fuel charge and a fee on industrial emissions) and implemented a backstop federal system in jurisdictions where carbon pricing is not implemented by the provincial or territorial government.

The legislative changes resulting from the  2019 budget were implemented in Bill C-97. Among the changes was the creation of the Canada Training Credit and the Digital News Subscription Tax Credit, a 5-year extension of the Mineral Exploration Tax Credit, financial incentives for purchasing specified clean energy equipment and zero-emissions vehicles, exempting GST/HST from applying to supplies and imports of human ova and imports of human in vitro embryos, allowing non-profit news organizations to issue charitable receipts, eliminating the requirement to complete an application to enroll into the Canada Pension Plan, allowing recipients of the Old Age Security to earn $5,000 of income without deductions, creating a First-Time Home Buyer Incentive administered by CHMC, creating a six-month interest-free period on student loans, and redirecting revenue raised from carbon pricing to the areas where it was raised. Bill C-97 also amended the Canada Business Corporations Act to add the interests retirees and pensioners to the list of factors to be considered in the best interests of corporations, and to require certain classes of corporations to disclose to their shareholders prescribed information on the diversity and remuneration of their directors and senior management and the well-being of employees and pensioners. Non-financial or business related amendments within Bill C-97 include a modernization of the Pilotage Act, increasing the number of judges on the Federal Court, making a provision which prevents people from making a refugee claim if they have already made a refugee claim in another country and inserting the Thaidene Nëné National Park Reserve into the Canada National Parks Act. Bill C-97 included within it the enactment of several other acts, including the Poverty Reduction Act, the National Housing Strategy Act, the College of Immigration and Citizenship Consultants Act, the Security Screening Services Commercialization Act, the Federal Prompt Payment for Construction Work Act.

Private member bills
Ten private member bills received royal assent, with only Bill C-210 not receiving unanimous  support:
Mauril Bélanger's An Act to amend the National Anthem Act (gender) (Bill C-210) replaces the words "in all thy sons command" to "in all of us command" in the English version of the national anthem,
Todd Doherty's Federal Framework on Post-Traumatic Stress Disorder Act (Bill C-211) requires the Minister of Health to prepare a framework for tracking incidence rates and for establishing guidelines for diagnosing, treating and managing post-traumatic stress disorder,
Ron McKinnon's Good Samaritan Drug Overdose Act (Bill C-224) amends the Controlled Drugs and Substances Act to provide immunity from drug possession charges when seeking help to address an overdose,
Rob Nicholson's National Strategy for Alzheimer's Disease and Other Dementias Act (Bill C-233) requires the Minister of Health develop and implement a national strategy to address aspects of dementia in the healthcare system, 
Darren Fisher's National Strategy for Safe and Environmentally Sound Disposal of Lamps Containing Mercury Act (Bill C-238) requires the Minister of the Environment develop a national strategy for the disposal tube and compact fluorescent light bulbs,
Marilyn Gladu's Framework on Palliative Care in Canada Act (Bill C-277) requires the Minister of Health prepare a framework for improving access and delivery of palliative care,
Chandra Arya's An Act to amend the Criminal Code (mischief) (Bill C-305) expands the scope of the Criminal Code provisions relating to acts of mischief motivated by hate on religious property to also cover educational institutions, community centres, sports or recreational facilities and a residence for seniors,
Sven Spengemann's Gender Equality Week Act (Bill C-309) names the fourth week in September in every year Gender Equality Week,
Colin Fraser's An Act to amend the Holidays Act (Remembrance Day) (Bill C-311) adds the word legal to the act.
Sukh Dhaliwal's Sikh Heritage Month Act (Bill C-376) names April of every year Sikh Heritage Month.

Senate bills
On behalf of the government, senate government bills included  the Strengthening Motor Vehicle Safety for Canadians Act (Bill S-2) which amended the Motor Vehicle Safety Act to allow the Minister of Transport to order a motor vehicle company to issue a recall, rather than allow the process to be at the manufacturer's discretion; Bill S-3 which amended the Indian Act as the government's response to a Quebec Superior Court ruling finding sex-based inequities in the Indian Register to be contrary to the Charter of Rights and Freedoms; Bills S-4 and S-6 which implemented tax treaties with Israel, Taiwan and Madagascar; and Bill S-5 renamed the Tobacco Act to the Tobacco and Vaping Products Act and introduced provisions relating to vaping products, such as a prohibition to selling or marketing to minors, plain packaging requirements and restrictions on advertising. Among the other bills initiated in the senate that were adopted by the parliament, Bill S-208 made May 20 of each year National Seal Products Day, Bill S-211 made June 19 of each year National Sickle Cell Awareness Day, Bill S-218 made October of every year Latin American Heritage Month, Bill S-232 made May of every year Canadian Jewish Heritage Month, and Bill S-236 simply states Charlottetown is the birthplace of Confederation. Other Senate public bills included the Justice for Victims of Corrupt Foreign Officials Act (Sergei Magnitsky Law) which allows the Governor-in-Council to seize property situated in Canada of a foreign national believed to be involved in extrajudicial killings or violations of internationally recognized human rights, and the Journalistic Sources Protection Act (Bill S-231) which allows journalists to object to an order to reveal a source of information and have the objection weighed by a court judge in light of public interest and rights to privacy. The Genetic Non-Discrimination Act (Bill S-201) was adopted with the Conservative Party, NDP and Green Party in favour; Liberal Party members were granted a free vote though the prime-minister urged members to oppose the bill, as presented, based on concerns of inconsistency with the Constitution. The act makes it a criminal offence to require an individual to undergo a genetic test, or to disclose the results of such a test, as a condition of providing goods or services, with exceptions for health care practitioners and researchers.

Canadian Ministry
The 29th Canadian Ministry began with the 42nd Parliament and was sworn in by Gov. Gen. David Johnston on November 4, 2015. It was the first Cabinet of Canada to have an equal number of men and women. Prime Minister Trudeau appointed Bill Morneau to be Minister of Finance, Jody Wilson-Raybould as Minister of Justice and Attorney General of Canada, Jane Philpott as Minister of Health, Catherine McKenna as Minister of Environment and Climate Change, Harjit Sajjan as Minister of National Defence, and Ralph Goodale as Minister of Public Safety and Emergency Preparedness

The first change to the membership of the 29th Ministry occurred with the May 31, 2016, resignation of Hunter Tootoo as Minister of Fisheries, Oceans, and the Canadian Coast Guard so that he can sit as an independent MP; he was replaced by Dominic LeBlanc. The second change in membership came with the January 10, 2017, retirements of Foreign Affairs Minister Stéphane Dion and Immigration Minister John McCallum. The Prime Minister promoted Ahmed Hussen to replace McCallum at Immigration, and moved Chrystia Freeland from Minister of International Trade to Foreign Affairs, with François-Philippe Champagne being promoted to replace Freeland at International Trade. In that same cabinet shuffle MaryAnn Mihychuk was removed from cabinet and Karina Gould promoted to cabinet, with Patty Hajdu replacing Mihychuk as Minister of Employment, Workforce, and Labour, Maryam Monsef replacing Hajdu as Minister of Status of Women, and Gould taking over Monsef's role as Minister of Democratic Institutions.

An August 28, 2017, cabinet shuffle instigated by Judy Foote, Minister of Public Services and Procurement, resigning as an MP due to health concerns, saw Foote replaced by Minister of Sport and Persons with Disabilities Carla Qualtrough, with Kent Hehr becoming Sports minister and Seamus O'Regan being promoted to take over Hehr's role as Minister of Veterans Affairs. In that same cabinet shuffle Philpott moved to the newly created Minister of Indigenous Services with Ginette Petitpas Taylor being promoted to replace Philpott as Health minister. On January 25, 2018, Hehr resigned from cabinet following accusations of inappropriate behaviour and was replaced by Kirsty Duncan who added Hehr's role as Sports minister to her existing duties as Minister of Science.

A major cabinet shuffle on July 18, 2018, saw the promotion of five MPs to cabinet with duties within several ministries shifted around. Bill Blair had the Ministry of Border Security and Organized Crime Reduction created for him from duties split off of Ahmed Hussen's portfolio. Jonathan Wilkinson took over the Minister of Fisheries, Oceans, and the Canadian Coast Guard role from Dominic LeBlanc who became Minister of Intergovernmental Affairs, Northern Affairs and Internal Trade, with Intergovernmental Affairs coming from Trudeau's own portfolio and Northern Affairs from Carolyn Bennett's. Pablo Rodríguez took over the Ministry of Canadian Heritage from Mélanie Joly who had the role of Minister of Tourism, Official Languages and La Francophonie created for her, taking La Francophonie from Marie-Claude Bibeau and Tourism from Bardish Chagger's portfolio. While Chagger remained Leader of the Government in the House of Commons her responsibility for Small Business went to Mary Ng who became Minister of Small Business and Export Promotion. Filomena Tassi became the Minister of Seniors, split out of Jean-Yves Duclos portfolio. Jim Carr took over Minister of International Trade Diversification from François-Philippe Champagne who took over as Minister of Infrastructure and Communities from Amarjeet Sohi who took over Carr's role as Minister of Natural Resources.

A shuffle on January 14, 2019, instigated by the resignation of Scott Brison, President of the Treasury Board, saw Jane Philpott move from Minister of Indigenous Services to replace Brison, with Seamus O'Regan filling her former position and Jody Wilson-Raybould replacing him as Minister of Veterans Affairs. Both David Lametti and Bernadette Jordan were promoted to cabinet from parliamentary secretary roles; Lametti to replace Wilson-Raybould as Minister of Justice and Attorney General and Jordan to fill the new role of Minister of Rural Economic Development. Amidst the SNC-Lavalin affair Wilson-Raybould and Philpott resigned their cabinet positions and were replaced by Lawrence MacAulay and Joyce Murray, respectively, with Marie-Claude Bibeau taking over MacAulay's former role as Minister of Agriculture and Maryam Monsef adding Bibeau's International Development duties to her existing duties as Minister of Status of Women.

Senate
At the beginning of the 42nd Parliament, the senate consisted of 83 members, 47 of which caucused with the Conservative Party and 29 with the Senate Liberal Caucus. Of those who left the Senate during the 42nd Parliament, 18 had reached the mandatory retirement age, including 10 Conservatives and the last remaining senator appointed by Pierre Trudeau, and 11 voluntarily resigned, including 7 Liberals. One senator (Tobias Enverga) died while in office. The new Prime-Minister's first appointment to the senate was, in March 2016, Peter Harder to act as the Government  Representative. To move the senate towards more independence, the Prime-Minister established the Independent Advisory Board for Senate Appointments to provide merit-based recommendations. Based on their first set of recommendations, Premier Trudeau appointed 6 new senators in April, including chairman of the Truth and Reconciliation Commission Murray Sinclair, former NDP provincial minister Frances Lankin, journalist André Pratte, Paralympian Chantal Petitclerc, and academics Raymonde Gagné and Ratna Omidvar. In the meantime, between November 2015 and March 2016, four Conservative, two Liberals and the last remaining Progressive Conservative senator had changed their party standing to non-affiliated. A further three Senate Liberals and one Conservative went independent between April and July, before the Prime-Minister appointed the next set of senators in November, 17 in total, based on the recommendations of the Independent Advisory Board, and all of whom sat as "non-affiliated". These senators included Éric Forest, bankers Sabi Marwah and Lucie Moncion, police commissioner Gwen Boniface, academics or doctors Yuen Pau Woo, Wanda Thomas Bernard, Diane Griffin, Marie-Françoise Mégie, Harvey Chochinov, art historian Patricia Bovey, lawyers Marilou McPhedran, Renée Dupuis, Marc Gold, former public servants Tony Dean, Howard Wetston, Raymonde Saint-Germain, and artist René Cormier. Also during that time, the Independent Senators Group was founded, in March 2016, as a non-partisan parliamentary group and on December 2, 2016, 33 non-affiliated members joined to form inaugural membership of Independent Senators Group. Trudeau appointed two more senators, Rosa Galvez and Daniel Christmas, in December 2016 and three in all of 2017, Mary Coyle, dentist Mary Jane McCallum and writer David Adams Richards,  all of whom joined the Independent Senators group. Also in 2017, the Independent Senators Group took over the majority of the senate, though they did not vote as a block, with 37 members in October, from the Conservative Party who had 36 members. Throughout 2018, a further 19 senators were appointed, all of whom caucused with the Independent Senators Group, including teacher Marty Deacon, lawyers Yvonne Boyer, Pierre Dalphond and Josée Forest-Niesing, doctor Mohamed-Iqbal Ravalia, interim RCMP Commissioner Bev Busson, journalists Paula Simons and Julie Miville-Dechêne, and former Yukon Premier Pat Duncan.

Members

Representation by Province/Territory

House of Commons
For background on the current representation, see:
The representation acts in the List of Canadian constitutional documents
Elections Canada's history on the representation formula (including the 1985 Representation Act, but any subsequent acts such as the 1999 Constitution Act or the 2011 Fair Representation Act).
Canadian Parliamentary Review's proposal for fairer representation for small provinces (around the time of the 2011 representation formula revision).

Senate

Officeholders
The officers of Parliament as of the dissolution of the 42nd Parliament are set out below.

Speakers
 Speaker of the Senate: Hon. George Furey, Non-affiliated Senator for Newfoundland & Labrador. (Dec 3, 2015 – Present)
 Speaker of the House of Commons: Hon. Geoff Regan, Liberal Member for Halifax West, NS. (Dec 3, 2015 – Present)

Other Chair occupants
Senate
 Speaker pro tempore of the Canadian Senate: Hon. Nicole Eaton, Conservative Senator for Ontario (Dec 9, 2015 – Present)

House of Commons
 Deputy Speaker and Chair of Committees of the Whole: Bruce Stanton, Conservative member for Simcoe North, Ontario
 Deputy Chair of Committees of the Whole: Carol Hughes, NDP member for Algoma—Manitoulin—Kapuskasing, Ontario
 Assistant Deputy Chair of Committees of the Whole: Anthony Rota, Liberal member for Nipissing—Timiskaming, Ontario

Party Leaders
 Prime Minister of Canada: Rt. Hon. Justin Trudeau (Liberal)
 Leader of Her Majesty's Loyal Opposition: (Conservative)
Hon. Rona Ambrose (interim, November 5, 2015 – May 27, 2017)
Hon. Andrew Scheer (May 27, 2017 – present)
 Leader of the New Democratic Party: 
 Hon. Thomas Mulcair (until October 1, 2017)
 Jagmeet Singh (since October 1, 2017) (from outside of the House until March 17, 2019)
Guy Caron (Parliamentary leader between October 4, 2017, and March 17, 2019)
 Leader of the Bloc Québécois: 
Rhéal Fortin (interim, October 22, 2015 – March 18, 2017)
Martine Ouellet (March 18, 2017 – June 13, 2018) (from outside of the House)
Mario Beaulieu (interim, June 13, 2018 – January 17, 2019)
Yves-François Blanchet (January 17, 2019 – present) (from outside of the House)
 Leader of the Green Party: Elizabeth May
 Leader of the People's Party: Maxime Bernier

Floor leaders
Senate
 Representative of the Government in the Senate: Hon. Peter Harder (Non-affiliated)
 Leader of the Opposition in the Senate: (Conservative)
 Hon. Claude Carignan (until March 31, 2017)
 Hon. Larry Smith (from April 1, 2017)
  Facilitator of the Independent Senators Group: 
 Elaine McCoy (September 27, 2016 – September 25, 2017)
 Yuen Pau Woo (September 25, 2017 – present)
 Leader of the Senate Liberal Caucus: 
 Hon. Jim Cowan (January 29, 2014 – June 15, 2016)
 Hon. Joseph A. Day (June 15, 2016 – present)

House of Commons
 Government House Leader: 
 Hon. Dominic LeBlanc (November 4, 2015 – August 19, 2016)
 Hon. Bardish Chagger (August 19, 2016 – present)
 Opposition House Leader: 
 Hon. Andrew Scheer (November 18, 2015 – September 15, 2016)
 Hon. Candice Bergen (September 15, 2016 – present)
 NDP House Leader: 
 Peter Julian (October 24, 2017 – January 24, 2018)
 Ruth Ellen Brosseau (January 31, 2018 – present)
 Bloc Québécois House Leader: 
 Luc Thériault (October 22, 2015 – March 18, 2017)
 Gabriel Ste-Marie (March 19, 2017 – February 26, 2018)

Whips
Senate
 Chief Government Liaison: Hon. Grant Mitchell
 Deputy Government Liaison: Hon. Nick Sibbeston
 Chief Opposition Whip: Hon. Don Plett
 Deputy Opposition Whip: Hon. David Wells
 Senate Liberal Whip: 
 Hon. Jim Munson (until September 28, 2016)
 Hon. Percy Downe (September 28, 2016 – Present)
 Deputy Senate Liberal Whip: Hon. Libbe Hubley

House of Commons
 Chief Government Whip: 
 Hon. Andrew Leslie (November 4, 2015 – January 18, 2017)
 Hon. Pablo Rodríguez (January 19, 2017 – Present)
 Deputy Government Whip: 
 Hon. Ginette Petitpas Taylor (November 4, 2015 – January 26, 2017)
 Hon. Filomena Tassi (January 26, 2017 – Present)
 Chief Opposition Whip: 
Gord Brown (November 11, 2015 – July 19, 2018)
Mark Strahl (July 20, 2018 – Present)
 Deputy Chief Opposition Whip: 
Dave MacKenzie (November 11, 2015 – August 28, 2017)
John Brassard (August 28, 2017 – Present)
 NDP Whip: Marjolaine Boutin-Sweet
 Bloc Québécois Whip: Monique Pauzé

Caucus Chairs 
 Liberal Party Caucus Chair: Francis Scarpaleggia
 Conservative Party Caucus Chair: David Sweet
 New Democratic Party Caucus Chair: 
 Charlie Angus (until November 23, 2016)
 Ruth Ellen Brosseau (November 23, 2016 – January 24, 2017)
 Daniel Blaikie (January 24, 2017 – Present)

Shadow cabinets
 Official Opposition Shadow Cabinet of the 42nd Parliament of Canada
 New Democratic Party Shadow Cabinet of the 42nd Parliament of Canada
 Bloc Québécois Shadow Cabinet of the 42nd Parliament of Canada

Committees

Standing
Access to Information, Privacy and Ethics

Agriculture and Agri-Food

Canadian Heritage

Citizenship and Immigration

Environment and Sustainable Development

Finance

Fisheries and Oceans

Foreign Affairs and International Development

Government Operations and Estimates

Health

Human Resources, Skills and Social Development and the Status of Persons with Disabilities

Indigenous and Northern Affairs

Industry, Science and Technology

International Trade

Justice and Human Rights

National Defence

Natural Resources

Official Languages

Procedure and House Affairs

Public Accounts

Public Safety and National Security

Status of Women

Transport, Infrastructure and Communities

Veterans Affairs

Joint Committee on the Library of Parliament

Joint Committee for the Scrutiny of Regulations

Special
Electoral Reform
Chair: Francis Scarpaleggia
Vice-chairs: Scott Reid and Nathan Cullen
 John Aldag
 Alexandre Boulerice
 Matt DeCourcey
 Gérard Deltell
 Elizabeth May
 Blake Richards
 Sherry Romanado
 Ruby Sahota
 Luc Thériault

Pay Equity
Chair: Anita Vandenbeld
Vice-chairs: Shannon Stubbs and Sheri Benson 
Dan Albas
Matt DeCourcey
Julie Dzerowicz
Marilyn Gladu
Eva Nassif
Terry Sheehan
Sonia Sidhu

Joint Committee on Physician-Assisted Dying
Chair (elected Jan.18): Rob Oliphant
Vice-chairs: Michael Cooper and Murray Rankin
Harold Albrecht
John Aldag
René Arseneault
Guy Caron
Julie Dabrusin
Gérard Deltell
Denis Lemieux
Brenda Shanahan

Changes to party standings

House of Commons

Membership Changes 

The party standings in the House of Commons have changed as follows:

Senate

Membership changes 

The party standings in the Senate have changed during the 42nd Canadian Parliament as follows:

Notes

External links 
 List of bills enacted by the 42nd Parliament of Canada at the Parliament of Canada

References

 
2015 establishments in Canada
2019 disestablishments in Canada
Justin Trudeau
2010s in Canadian politics